"Children of the Grave" is a song by English heavy metal band Black Sabbath, from their 1971 album Master of Reality.  The song lyrically continues with the same anti-war themes brought on by "War Pigs" and "Electric Funeral" from Paranoid.

The song has been featured on a number of greatest hits and live albums by Black Sabbath, as well as by the band's lead vocalist Ozzy Osbourne during his solo career.

Track listing 
 "Children of the Grave" (Edit) – 3:47 
 "Solitude" - 3:45

Legacy
"Children of the Grave" is widely considered one of Black Sabbath's greatest songs. In 2020, Kerrang ranked the song number six on their list of the 20 greatest Black Sabbath songs, and in 2021, Louder Sound ranked the song number five on their list of the 40 greatest Black Sabbath songs.

Cover versions

White Zombie version 

The band White Zombie covered "Children of the Grave" (with slightly altered lyrics) for the Black Sabbath tribute album Nativity in Black. It was later released as a promo single in 1994. The cover did not chart, but did receive some radio airplay on active rock stations in America.

Track listing

Personnel
White Zombie
Rob Zombie – vocals
Jay Yuenger – guitar
Sean Yseult – bass
Phil Buerstatte – drums

Production
Bryan Carlstrom – production
White Zombie – production 
Bob Chiappardi – executive producer
Terry Date – mixing

Nepal version 
The Argentine thrash metal band Nepal recorded  a cover version of the song for their third studio album, Manifiesto (1997).

Havok version 
American thrash metal band Havok included a cover of the song on their third studio album, Unnatural Selection (2013).

Master version 
American death metal band Master covered the song for their 1990 debut album Master.  Whilst keeping the clean finger picking intro of Embryo and the opening build up, the rest of the cover is more similar to the style of Venom.

Jazz Sabbath version 
English jazz trio Jazz Sabbath released an instrumental jazz rendition of this song on their 2020 self-titled debut album.

Racer X version 
American heavy metal band Racer X covered this song and released it as a bonus track in the European/Japanese edition of the album Technical Difficulties (1999).

References

Black Sabbath songs
1971 songs
Anti-war songs
White Zombie (band) songs
1994 singles
Songs written by Ozzy Osbourne
Songs written by Tony Iommi
Songs written by Geezer Butler
Songs written by Bill Ward (musician)
Columbia Records singles
Vertigo Records singles